The Niger national under-17 football team is the U-17 football team for Niger. The team represents the country in international under-17 matches and is controlled by the Fédération Nigerienne de Football.

Tournament Records

FIFA U-17 World Cup record

CAF U-17 Championship record 

 Red border color indicates tournament was held on home soil.
*Draws include knockout matches decided on penalty kicks.

Current squad
The following players were selected to compete in the 2017 FIFA U-17 World Cup.

Head coach:  Ismaila Tiemoko

External links

 Niger Football Federation website

U
African national under-17 association football teams
African national association football teams